Sir William Carson (baptised 4 June 1770 – 26 February 1843), often called "The Great Reformer", was a medical doctor and businessman in Newfoundland. Carson's primary contribution to Newfoundland was the application of modern agricultural principles.

Upon immigrating to Newfoundland in 1806 from Scotland, Carson set to work clearing a large patch of land near St. John's. He also began calling for increased economic support from England, a more organized fishery in the area and better treatment of the local natives.

Between 1820 and 1832, he helped lead the movement in Newfoundland's struggle for representative government, which culminated in Carson's election to office in 1832. While in office, he was noted for helping quarantine an outbreak of cholera in the area.

From 1838 to 1841, Carson was Speaker of the Newfoundland House of Assembly.

Legacy
The CN Marine ferry M/V William Carson was named in his honour.

References

External links
Biography at the Dictionary of Canadian Biography Online

1770 births
1843 deaths
Scottish emigrants to pre-Confederation Newfoundland
People from Dumfries and Galloway
Speakers of the Newfoundland and Labrador House of Assembly
Persons of National Historic Significance (Canada)
Newfoundland Colony people